Assyrian Apostolic Church may refer to:

 Assyrian Apostolic Church of the East, an Eastern Christian denomination of the East Syriac Rite
 Assyrian Jacobite Apostolic Church, former name for parishes of the Syriac Orthodox Church in the USA

See also
 Assyrian Church (disambiguation)
 Assyrian (disambiguation)